Janne Tapani Pesonen (born 11 May 1982) is a Finnish former professional ice hockey winger who played for Oulun Kärpät of the Finnish Liiga.

Playing career
Pesonen began his career with Hokki in 1998, playing in the second-highest division of hockey in Finland, the Mestis.

Kärpät
He then played for Kärpät in the Finnish top division, the SM-liiga, from 2001–02 and 2003–08. After his first season with Kärpät he returned to Hokki for one season in 2002–03. He returned to Kärpät in 2003–04 and won the SM-liiga Rookie of the Year award, helping Kärpät to their first Finnish championship since 1981. His five seasons with Kärpät from 2003–08 saw Pesonen win four Finnish championships in total, in 2004, 2005, 2007, and 2008. He won the Jari Kurri trophy, which is annually awarded the playoff MVP, in 2007. He had his best season in 2007–08 when he led the SM-liiga in goals, points, and plus-minus, winning the Aarne Honkavaara, Veli-Pekka Ketola, and Matti Keinonen trophies, respectively, for his efforts. That season he tallied 34 goals and 44 assists for a total 78 points in only 56 games played.

Pittsburgh Penguins
On 7 July 2008, the Pittsburgh Penguins announced that they signed Pesonen to a one-year contract. After 3 preseason games in which he tallied 1 goal and 1 assist, Pesonen was sent to the Penguins' AHL affiliate, the Wilkes-Barre/Scranton Penguins, on 8 October 2008. Pesonen would show his ability to adapt to the North American style of hockey by scoring 9 pts in his first seven games, scoring two goals and garnering seven assists. On 31 October, Pesonen was recalled by the Pittsburgh Penguins, where he made his NHL debut on 1 November against the St. Louis Blues. Pesonen's stay with the Penguins was brief, and he was returned to the AHL after seven games. On 16 March, Pesonen set a new record for points in a single season for the Wilkes-Barre/Scranton Baby Penguins, passing up Toby Petersen's 67-point season of 2000–01. At season's end, Pesonen finished with 82 points, fourth in the AHL in scoring and the highest point total by a Finn in AHL history.

Ak Bars Kazan
After one season in North America, Pesonen opted to return to Europe and signed with Russian club Ak Bars Kazan of the Kontinental Hockey League on 4 August 2009. He left Kazan after two seasons for a try-out contract with the Winnipeg Jets of the National Hockey League (NHL) on 11 August 2011. He was released from the Jets on 2 October, after failing to get an extended offer.

After a year in Finland playing for HIFK, Pesonen announced he had signed a one-year contract with Ak Bars Kazan.

HC Ambri-Piotta
On August 24, 2016, Pesonen signed a seven-week contract with HC Ambrì-Piotta of the National League A (NLA) as an injury replacement for Adam Hall.

Career statistics

Regular season and playoffs

International

Awards
American Hockey League
Second All-Star Team – 2008–09
Kontinental Hockey League
Gagarin Cup Champion – 2009–10
SM-liiga
All-Star Team – 2006–07, 2007–08
Best Player in Playoffs (Jari Kurri Award) – 2006–07
Best Plus–Minus (Matti Keinonen Trophy) – 2007–08
Bronze Medal – 2005–06
Champion – 2003–04, 2004–05, 2006–07, 2007–08
Most Assists by Rookie – 2003–04
Most Game-Winning Goals – 2007–08
Most Goals (Aarne Honkavaara Trophy) – 2007–08
Most Goals by Rookie – 2003–04
Most Points (Veli-Pekka Ketola Trophy) – 2007–08
Most Points by Rookie – 2003–04
Most Power Play Goals – 2007–08
Most Shorthanded Goals – 2007–08
Player of the Month – 2007–08
Rookie of the Year – 2003–04
World Championship
Gold Medal – 2011
Swedish Hockey League
Le Mat Trophy – 2017–18

References

External links

1982 births
Living people
Ak Bars Kazan players
HC Ambrì-Piotta players
Finnish expatriate ice hockey players in Russia
Finnish ice hockey left wingers
HIFK (ice hockey) players
Hokki players
Anaheim Ducks draft picks
Oulun Kärpät players
People from Suomussalmi
Skellefteå AIK players
Pittsburgh Penguins players
Växjö Lakers players
Wilkes-Barre/Scranton Penguins players
Sportspeople from Kainuu